Château Rol Valentin is a Bordeaux wine from the appellation Saint-Émilion Grand Cru, an area next to Saint-Émilion proper.  Do not confuse such wines with those that are ranked Grand cru in the Classification of Saint-Émilion wine. The winery is located in the Right Bank of France’s Bordeaux wine region in the commune of Saint-Émilion, in the department Gironde.

The wine's small production and use of oak in combination with high prices and ratings places it among Saint-Émilion's "Vins de garage".

History
In 1994 the estate was acquired by Eric Prisette, a retired professional footballer, and his wife Virginie. Rol Valentin employs Stephane Derenoncourt as consultant oenologist.

Production
The vineyard area extends 4.6 hectares, with the grape varieties of 85% Merlot, 8% Cabernet Franc and 7% Cabernet Sauvignon.

There is typically an annual production of 14,000 bottles.

References

External links
 Château Rol Valentin official site 

Bordeaux wine producers